"Don't Shoot Me Santa" is a song by Las Vegas-based rock band The Killers. The song was released , as a digital download. A portion of the proceeds from this song went to AIDS charities as part of the Product Red campaign, headed by Bono and Bobby Shriver. It is The Killers' second Christmas download single following 2006's "A Great Big Sled".

Track listing 

 CD Single
 "Don't Shoot Me Santa" - 4:04
 "Don't Shoot Me Santa" (Enhanced Video) - 4:34

Release history

Music video 

According to Japanese Vogue, the video for "Don't Shoot Me Santa" was directed, edited, and co-produced by actor/director/model/visual artist Matthew Gray Gubler, who is also a native of Las Vegas.

The music video starts in a desert with a puppet version of Flowers and a puppet version of Santa in a puppet theater in Santa's trailer. Then, Santa pops up to say his part "I've got a bullet in my gun!" It goes to Flowers tied up in a chair with Christmas tree trimmings and Santa running around him. Later on, Flowers is tied up in Santa's car with Santa driving. It then goes back to the Santa's trailer with Flowers still tied up in a chair watching Santa dig up his grave. The band come up behind 3 small trees, break the trimmings, and escape in Santa's car, trailing him behind. Santa ends up covering up Flowers's puppet, and goes to the band (in puppet form) holding up a sign saying, 'Merry Christmas from The Killers'.

Ryan Pardey 

The role of Santa (both singing, and acting in the music video) is performed by Ryan Pardey. He performed this song live, with the band, at KROQ Almost Acoustic Christmas in December 2007. He and Flowers were shown dancing together on stage, and he soaked Flowers with a water-gun. The Killers have written a song about Pardey called "Questions With the Captain". The song appears as a hidden track on the end of their B-sides album Sawdust, but can only be found on the CD.

Charts

References 

The Killers songs
American Christmas songs
Black comedy music
Christmas charity singles
Music videos featuring puppetry
2007 singles
Songs about Santa Claus
Song recordings produced by Stuart Price
Songs written by Brandon Flowers
Songs written by Dave Keuning
Songs written by Ronnie Vannucci Jr.
Songs written by Mark Stoermer
2007 songs
Island Records singles